Sawmill is a software package for the statistical analysis and reporting of log files, with dynamic contextual filtering, live data zooming, user interface customization, and custom calculated reports. Sawmill also incorporates real-time reporting and alerting. Sawmill has been available since 1997.

Sawmill provides support for approximately 850 server log file formats, with new formats added on request. Sawmill also includes a page-tagging server and JavaScript page tag for the analysis of client side clicks (client requests) providing a total view of visitor traffic and on-site behavioral activity.

Sawmill Analytics is offered in three forms: a software package for user deployment, a system appliance for use on-premises, and an application for software as a service (SaaS). Sawmill analyzes any device or software package, producing a log file that includes web servers, firewalls, proxy servers, mail servers, network devices, syslog servers, and databases.

Sawmill is the OEM reporting engine sold by Blue Coat Systems as a bundled part of their proxy server product. Branded versions of Sawmill include Sawmill for IronPort by Cisco Systems, InterGate Intelligence by Vicomsoft Ltd, and SonicWALL Aventail Advanced Reporting by SonicWALL.

Sawmill was a second runner-up in the 2009 Streaming Media European Readers' Choice Awards.

Sawmill is listed in the Ideal Observer's Web Analytics Tool Overview.

See also
Log analysis
List of web analytics software
Sawzall (programming language)

References

External links
http://www.sawmill.net, for universal web log analysis and reporting.
http://www.sawmill.co.uk, Distribution, training, sales and support for the EMEA region.
comparison of analytics software from AWStats documentation
PC Magazine review of Sawmill 6 from 2001, retrieved 2009-11-27
Tiscali review of Sawmill 7 from Information Management Magazine, September 1, 2008.  Retrieved 2009-12-03.

Web analytics
Web log analysis software